The Communities Liaison Committee (CLC) was established in 1949 by the British rulers of Malaysia, comprising the top echelon of Malayan politicians from different communities, to address sensitive issues, especially those related to ethnicity. Compromises on a number of issues, including citizenship, education, democracy, and Malay supremacy, were agreed on and set the stage for Malayan independence. The CLC was chaired by Malcolm MacDonald, the British Commissioner-General for Southeast Asia.

The Communities Liaison Committee was a prototype for multiracial political cooperation.

Composition

Notes

References
"Colonial Office Records relating to the meetings of the Communities Liaison Committee, April 1949 to September 1949: CO 717/183" In Christie, Clive J. (1998) Southeast Asia in the Twentieth Century: A Reader Tauris, London, pp. 193–198 
"Communities Liaison Committee Communiqué, 16 September 1949 - Public Relations, Singapore, Press Release No. SE49/168" In Christie, Clive J. (1998) Southeast Asia in the Twentieth Century: A Reader Tauris, London, pp. 199–201 
"Statement on Federal Citizenship issued by the Communities Liaison Committee, 18 April 1950" In Gott, Richard; Major, John and Warner, Geoffrey (eds.) (1973) Documents on International Affairs Royal Institute of International Affairs, Oxford University Press, London, p. 592, OCLC 1566847

|}

History of Malaysia
Malaysian Independence
1949 establishments in Malaya